= Potato production in Latvia =

Potato production in Latvia has been decreasing since 2003. Latvia produced 209,900 tons of potato in 2014.

Potatoes were introduced to Europe in the 16th century, but only became seriously cultivated in Latvia in the 19th century. This involved extensive research in breeding potatoes suitable for Latvian conditions, and resistance to pests and diseases.
